Tzoumerka is a former municipality in the Ioannina regional unit, Epirus, Greece. Since the 2011 local government reform it is part of the municipality North Tzoumerka, of which it is a municipal unit. The municipal unit has an area of 71.10 km2. Population 756 (2011). The seat of the municipality was in Chouliarades.

During the Axis occupation of Greece (1941-1944) the main base of the EDES resistance organization was found in the Tzoumerka mountain.

References

Populated places in Ioannina (regional unit)